Second-seeded Margaret Osborne duPont defeated Doris Hart 6–4, 6–1 in the final to win the women's singles tennis title at the 1949 U.S. National Championships.

Seeds
The tournament used two lists of seven players for seeding the women's singles event; one for U.S. players and one for foreign players. Margaret Osborne duPont is the champion; others show in brackets the round in which they were eliminated.

Draw

Key
 Q = Qualifier
 WC = Wild card
 LL = Lucky loser
 r = Retired

Final eight

References

1949
1949 in women's tennis
1949 in American women's sports
Women's Singles